Jerry Jameson (born November 26, 1934) is an American television and film director, editor and producer.

Biography
Highly prolific, he began career in 1964 as an editor on the episode "The Song Festers" of The Andy Griffith Show, soon moving to work as an associate producer or editorial supervisor (sometimes both) on hundreds of episodes of numerous different television series, from 1965 through 1970. Jameson started directing with the 1971 episode "Trackdown" of the series Dan August, before going on to direct over 100 episodes of shows like The Six Million Dollar Man, Ironside, Dallas, Murder, She Wrote, and Walker, Texas Ranger. He also directed numerous made-for-TV movies and theatrical motion pictures, including Airport '77, Raise the Titanic, and Captive.

Partial directorial filmography 

1970 : The Mod Squad
1971 : Dan August
1972 : Brute Corps (film)
1972 : Search
1972 : The Dirt Gang (film)
1974 : Heatwave! (TV film)
1972 : The Rookies
1973 : Cannon
1974 : Heatwave! (TV film)
1974 : The Bat People (film)
1974 : The Elevator (TV film)
1974 : Hurricane (TV film)
1974 : Terror on the 40th Floor (TV film)
1974 : The Six Million Dollar Man
1974 : McCloud
1975 : Ironside
1975 : The Streets of San Francisco
1975 : Hawaii Five-O
1975 : The Secret Night Caller (TV film)
1975 : The Deadly Tower (TV film)
1975 : The Lives of Jenny Dolan (TV film)
1976 : The Call of the Wild (TV film)
1976 : The Invasion of Johnson County (TV film)
1977 : Airport '77 (film)
1978 : Superdome (TV film)
1978 : A Fire in the Sky (TV film)
1980 : Raise the Titanic (film)
1980 : High Noon, Part II: The Return of Will Kane (TV film)
1980 : Dan August: Murder, My Friend (TV film, an edit that used Jameson's 1971 episode "Trackdown")
1981 : Stand by Your Man (TV film)
1981 : Killing at Hell's Gate (TV film)
1982 : Hotline (TV film)
1983 : Starflight: The Plane That Couldn't Land (TV film)
1983 : Cowboy
1983 : This Girl for Hire
1984 : Last of the Great Survivors
1984 : The Cowboy and the Ballerina
1985 : Stormin' Home (TV film)
1986 : Heat (film) (uncredited)
1986 : One Police Plaza (TV film)
1986 : Magnum, P.I.
1987 : Dallas
1988 : Dynasty
1988 : The Red Spider (TV film)
1989 : Fire and Rain (TV film)
1992 : Gunsmoke: To the Last Man (TV film)
1993 : Gunsmoke: The Long Ride (TV film)
1993 : Bonanza: The Return (TV film)
1993 : Walker, Texas Ranger
1994 : Gunsmoke: One Man's Justice (TV film)
1995 : Touched by an Angel
1996 : Dr. Quinn, Medicine Woman
1996 : Gone in a Heartbeat
1998 : Land of the Free (film)
2002 : The Red Phone: Manhunt (TV film)
2003 : The Red Phone: Checkmate (TV film)
2004 : Last Flight Out (TV film)
2015 : Captive (film)

References 
The American Vein: Directors and Directions in Television. Edited by Christopher Wicking, Tise Vahimagi

External links

The Accidental Auteur

American film directors
American film editors
1934 births
Living people
American film producers